Battle of Fort Fisher may refer to:

 First Battle of Fort Fisher – 1864
 Second Battle of Fort Fisher – 1865